The 86th Emperor's Cup had been held between September 17, 2006 and January 1, 2007. The previous season's winners Urawa Red Diamonds defended the Cup and completed the league-cup double.

Schedule

Matches

First round

Second round

Third round
The third round matches were held on October 8, 2006.

Fourth round

Fifth round

Quarter finals

Semi finals

Final

External links
 Official site of the 86th Emperor's Cup 
 Site of the 86th Emperor's Cup 

2006
2006 domestic association football cups
2006 in Japanese football
2007 in Japanese football